Philippe le Chancelier, also known as "Philippus Cancellarius Parisiensis" (Philip, Chancellor of Paris) (c 1160–December 26, 1236) was a French theologian, Latin lyric poet, and possibly a composer as well. He was the illegitimate son of Philippe, Archdeacon of Paris (born  1125), and was part of a family of powerful clerics. He was born and studied theology in Paris. He was chancellor of Notre Dame de Paris starting in 1217 until his death, and was also Archdeacon of Noyon. Philip is portrayed as an enemy to the Mendicant orders becoming prevalent at the time, but this has been greatly exaggerated. He may have even joined the Franciscan order soon before his death.

Philip was one of the most prolific Medieval lyric poets. He was the subject of  Henri d'Andeli's Dit du Chancelier Philippe. Philip's most influential work was his Summa de Bono.

Philip may have been a composer as well as a poet, although it is not certain, since many of his works are set to pre-existing tunes. He put text to many of Pérotin's works, creating some of the first Motets. His poems were available to many composers in the Notre Dame school, and his works were a moving force within that artistic movement.

He died in Paris.

References

Bibliography

Works
 Philippi Cancellari Parisiensis, Summa De Bono, Ad fidem codicum primum edita studio et cura Nicolai Wicki, Bern, Francke, 1985.

Studies
 Jan A. Aertsen, Medieval Philosophy as Transcendental Thought. From Philip the Chancellor (ca. 1225) to Francisco Suárez, Leiden, Brill, 2012.
 Ayelet Even-Ezra, Ecstasy in the Classroom: Trance, Self and the Academic Profession in Medieval Paris (Fordham University Press: NY, 2018).

External links 

13th-century French philosophers
12th-century French philosophers
Medieval French theologians
Medieval French poets
1236 deaths
1160s births
Chancellors of the University of Paris
13th-century French writers
Medieval Latin poets
13th-century French Roman Catholic priests
Medieval Paris
French male poets
13th-century Latin writers
13th-century French poets